Michele Geraci (born 1966, Palermo) is an Italian politician with an MBA from the Massachusetts Institute of Technology. He is known for his expertise in Chinese economics, having spent many years abroad in China, where he became fluent in Mandarin. He was Undersecretary of State at the Italian Ministry of Economic Development, responsible for international trade and foreign direct investments. in the Conte Government. 

In 2016, Michele Geraci was awarded the title Knight of the Order of the Star of Italy for his work in the fields of economics and finance concerning the economic ties between Italy and China.

Geraci is an economic columnist for Caixin 
and he has regularly published articles on Italian influential economic newspaper Il Sole24Ore / Radiocor.

Biography 
Michele Geraci graduated with honours in electronic engineering from the University of Palermo and in 1991 started his career as an electronic engineer British Telecom since 1989, a member of the Satellite Planning unit. He then obtained, in 1996, a Master’s in Business Administration from the Sloan School of Management of the Massachusetts Institute of Technology in Boston and began his career as an investment banker, working for 12 years in various banks and business firms between New York and London, such as Merrill-Lynch, Bank of America, Donaldson, Lufkin & Jenrette and Schroders.

In 2008 he moved to China, where he taught finance at two universities: University of Nottingham Ningbo China and New York University Shanghai, as well as number of short term appointments at Zhejiang University, Hangzhou and Southwestern University of Finance and Economics, Chengdu.

His work has focused on the impact of macroeconomic policies on the development of society, with particular focus on the impact of these policies on the weakest segments of the population. He has always held a cautious view on market liberalism, considering it on the one hand useful for the development of economies, but also the cause of serious income inequalities and other redistributive effects of wealth. To better analyse the socio-economic conditions of low-income groups, he conducted a study on microcredit in China, published by the Global Policy Institute in London and produced a documentary on the conditions of peasants in China, touching on topics such as agrarian reform and migration to urban centres. His interest in social issues, typically of the historical left-wing tradition, is also present in his proposal to introduce in Italy an advanced form of Universal Basic Income, conceived as a response to stem those negative effects of globalization.

In 2015 he also received by President of Italy, Sergio Mattarella, the honour of Knight of the Order of the Star of Italy, for having contributed to the spread of knowledge of China in Italy.

Close to the Lega, he collaborated with Matteo Salvini and participated in some party initiatives, proposing the Chinese economy as a model for Italy.

He also theorized the compatibility between the Universal Basic Income proposed by the 5 Star Movement (the so-called Reddito di cittadinanza, actually, technically, a guaranteed minimum income) and the flat tax proposed by the League, supporting, after the 2018 political elections  the possibility of an alliance between the two parties, as it then did turn out to be the case.

He was therefore appointed Undersecretary of State in the Ministry of Economic Development in the Conte I cabinet, supported by a coalition between M5S and Lega, from 2018 to 2019.

During the experience of the M5S-Lega coalition government, Geraci was the main architect of the signing of the memorandum of Italy's accession to the "New Silk Road", the geo-economic project of infrastructural and commercial connectivity with Chinese traction initially contested by the European Union and by the United States, but supported by President Mattarella. Geraci, was one of the main negotiators of the agreement, aimed at facilitating the access of Italian companies to the markets of Asia and Africa, improve trade and reciprocal investment.

Honors 
Knight of the Order of the Star of Italy- December 28, 2015

References

1966 births
Italian economists
Italian politicians
Italian expatriates in China
MIT Sloan School of Management alumni
Living people